Shannon Lynn (born 22 October 1985) is a Canadian-born Scottish female international football goalkeeper who plays in the Swedish Damallsvenskan for Vittsjö GIK. She has previously played in the North American W-League for Fort Wayne Fever and F.C. Indiana, in the Scottish Women's Premier League for Hibernian and in the FA WSL for Chelsea Ladies. Lynn made her senior Scotland debut against Switzerland in June 2010.

Lynn's first start for Scotland was a 2–0 win over England at the 2011 Cyprus Cup; the Scots' first win over the Auld Enemy for 34 years. Lynn won the Scottish Players' Player of the Year award for 2011.

Lynn joined Chelsea in an emergency deal in April 2013, after the club's only fit keeper Nicola Davies was posted to Oman with the Royal Air Force. She continued to train with Hibs while flying down for matches for the duration of the short-term contract. With Carly Telford recovered from a broken hand, Lynn was allowed to rejoin Hibernian in July 2013.

Lynn joined Swedish side Vittsjö GIK in April 2014 on a three-month contract.

Personal life
Lynn has spoken about suffering from depression due to the sudden death of her girlfriend when she was 22 and how football rescued her.

References

External links

 (archive)

1985 births
Living people
Soccer players from Brampton
Scottish women's footballers
Scotland women's international footballers
Canadian women's soccer players
Canadian people of Scottish descent
Hibernian W.F.C. players
Chelsea F.C. Women players
Women's Super League players
Damallsvenskan players
Scottish expatriate women's footballers
Expatriate women's footballers in Sweden
Vittsjö GIK players
Women's association football goalkeepers
Canadian expatriate women's soccer players
Canadian expatriate sportspeople in Scotland
Canadian expatriate sportspeople in England
F.C. Indiana players
2019 FIFA Women's World Cup players
LGBT association football players
Lesbian sportswomen
Canadian LGBT sportspeople
Scottish LGBT sportspeople
UEFA Women's Euro 2017 players
Fort Wayne Fever (W-League) players
USL W-League (1995–2015) players
Canadian expatriate sportspeople in the United States
Expatriate women's soccer players in the United States